The Helena Seaporters were a minor league baseball team that represented Helena, Arkansas and played in the Cotton States League from 1935 to 1949.

A previous team, the Helena Hellions, played in the Arkansas State League in 1908 and 1909.

References
Baseball Reference

Baseball teams established in 1935
Baseball teams disestablished in 1949
Defunct Cotton States League teams
Defunct Arkansas State League teams
Defunct East Dixie League teams
Defunct Northeast Arkansas League teams
Chicago Cubs minor league affiliates
Cincinnati Reds minor league affiliates
Professional baseball teams in Arkansas
1935 establishments in Arkansas
1949 disestablishments in Arkansas
History of Phillips County, Arkansas
Defunct baseball teams in Arkansas
East Dixie League teams